The Salmson AD.3 or Salmson 3 Ad was a French designed, three-cylinder, air-cooled radial aero engine. It was also produced by British Salmson in Great Britain during the 1920s.

Applications (3 Ad)
Adaridi AD 3
Farman Aviette
Peyret-Nessler Libellule

Engines on display
A preserved Salmson 3 Ad engine is on public display at the Deutsches Museum, Munich.

Specifications (AD.3)

See also

References

Notes

1920s aircraft piston engines
Aircraft air-cooled radial piston engines
Salmson aircraft engines